You're Not Leavin' Here Tonight is the twelfth studio album by American country music artist Ed Bruce. It was released in 1983 via MCA Records. The album includes the singles "You're Not Leavin' Here Tonight", "If It Was Easy" and "After All".

Track listing

Chart performance

References

1983 albums
Ed Bruce albums
Albums produced by Tommy West (producer)
MCA Records albums